John Harrison Crist (born August 28, 1954) is a retired decathlete from the United States, who finished in sixth place (8130 points) at the 1984 Summer Olympics in Los Angeles, California. He is a three-time national champion (1981, 1982 and 1985) in the men's decathlon. He later became the owner of "Memories" swingdance club in California, which has been open at its location in Whittier, California for over 15 years. He went to Arlington Schools in Atlanta, Georgia, where he was on a state championship basketball team.

References
 USA Olympic Team
 1984 Year List
 John Crist Bio Sports Reference
 
 "MEMORIES CELEBRATES FIFTEEN YEARS IN UPTOWN WHITTIER!"

1954 births
Living people
American male decathletes
Athletes (track and field) at the 1984 Summer Olympics
Olympic track and field athletes of the United States